Intrepid class is a ship class, usually named for a lead ship named Intrepid or a variation of;

 , British Royal Navy mid-19th-century wooden sloops
 , a British Royal Navy mid-18th-century third rate ships of the line
  of the Argentine Navy dating from the 1970s
  (Type 206 submarine) of the Colombian Navy, with two active units

See also

 
 Intrepid (ship), ships named Intrepid, including unique (non-class) ships
 Intrepid (disambiguation)

Ship classes
Ship naming conventions